A total lunar eclipse took place on Monday, May 3, 1920. It was visible from North America, South America, Europe, Africa, Middle east and Antarctica.

Visibility

Half-Saros cycle
A lunar eclipse will be preceded and followed by solar eclipses by 9 years and 5.5 days (a half saros). This lunar eclipse is related to two total solar eclipses of Solar Saros 127.

See also
List of lunar eclipses
List of 20th-century lunar eclipses

Notes

External links

1920-05
1920 in science